Rainald III (died before 1124) was the count of Toul in Upper Lotharingia in the late 11th century. He was the son of Frederick I, count of Astenois.

Biography 
He participated in the First Crusade in the army of his kinsman Duke Godfrey of Bouillon. He was a prominent second tier lord of the Crusade. He assisted Baldwin of Boulogne in capturing and creating the Crusader state of Edessa. He later returned to the main Crusader army and distinguished himself in the Siege of Antioch, commanding the seventh division of the Crusader army during the battle against Kerbogha. After the successful Crusade he returned to Europe, where he died sometime before 1124.

References

Sources 
 
 
 

Christians of the First Crusade
People from Toul